Standards is an album by the jazz trumpeter Lee Morgan, released on the Blue Note label. It was recorded on January 13, 1967, but not released until 1998; it contains performances by Morgan, Wayne Shorter, Herbie Hancock, Ron Carter, Billy Higgins, James Spaulding, Pepper Adams and Mickey Roker, with arrangements by Duke Pearson.

Reception
The AllMusic review by Scott Yanow stated: "Most of the selections, although allegedly 'standards,' were of more recent vintage (like 'A Lot of Livin' to Do' and 'If I Were a Carpenter'), and even if Morgan and the other musicians play well, nothing too exciting occurs. Although not a dud, it was not a major loss that this recording stayed in the vaults."

Track listing 
 "This Is the Life" (Adams, Strouse) - 5:02
 "God Bless the Child" (Herzog, Holiday) - 7:18
 "Blue Gardenia" (Lester Lee, Russell) - 5:51
 "Lot of Livin' to Do" (Adams, Strouse) - 6:02
 "Somewhere" (Bernstein, Sondheim) - 5:50
 "If I Were a Carpenter" (Hardin) - 6:08
 "Blue Gardenia" [Alternate Take] - 5:54

Personnel 
 Lee Morgan - trumpet
 Wayne Shorter - tenor saxophone
 James Spaulding - alto saxophone, flute
 Pepper Adams - baritone saxophone
 Herbie Hancock - piano
 Ron Carter - bass
 Mickey Roker - drums
 Duke Pearson - arranger

References 

Hard bop albums
Lee Morgan albums
1998 albums
Blue Note Records albums
Albums produced by Alfred Lion
Albums recorded at Van Gelder Studio